The World Socialist Party of New Zealand (WSPNZ) is a revolutionary socialist and anti-Leninist political party in New Zealand founded in 1930 as the Socialist Party of New Zealand (SPNZ).

The WSPNZ is affiliated with the Socialist Party of Great Britain (SPGB) and the World Socialist Movement (WSM).

In the 1940s, the party co-operated on Socialist Comment. In 1971, the party contested its first parliamentary election and in 1975 put up seven candidates.

The WSPNZ last ran a candidate in the 1996 election, gaining a total of 27 votes.

Radio 
The WSPNZ ran Radio Imagine 88.3 FM out of Manurewa, Auckland, starting as early as 2001.

References

External links 
 World Socialist Party (New Zealand).

Political parties established in 1930
Companion Parties of the World Socialist Movement
World Socialists